Horní Kruty is a municipality and village in Kolín District in the Central Bohemian Region of the Czech Republic. It has about 500 inhabitants.

Administrative parts
Villages of Bohouňovice II, Dolní Kruty, Přestavlky and Újezdec are administrative parts of Horní Kruty.

History
The first written mention of Horní Kruty is from 1228.

Gallery

References

External links

Villages in Kolín District